"Keep Your Lamp(s) Trimmed and Burning" is a traditional gospel blues song. It alludes to the Parable of the Wise and Foolish Virgins, found in the Gospel of Matthew at 25:1-13, and also to a verse in the Gospel of Luke, at 12:35.

The song has been attributed to Blind Willie Johnson, who recorded it in 1928; to Reverend Gary Davis, who recorded it in 1956; and to Mississippi Fred McDowell, who recorded it in 1959.

The song has been included in several hymnals.

Lyrics 
The song is in call-and-response format. As is common with traditional songs, lyrics vary between performersin this instance, often very widely. A usual first verse is:

"The world" and "the time" relate to the apocalyptic prophecies of the New Testament. "The work" can do so also, but suggests that the song may derive from an African-American work song.

Recordings 

Recordings by people with Wikipedia articles include:
 1928Blind Willie Johnson
 1956Reverend Gary Davis
 1959Mississippi Fred McDowell
 1967Skip James
 1970Hot Tuna, on the album Hot Tuna
 1970Wizz Jones, on the album The Legendary Me
 1971Hot Tuna, on the album First Pull Up, Then Pull Down 
 1975Pearly Brown, on the album It's a Mean Old World to Try to Live In
 1975John Fahey and his Orchestra, on the album Old Fashioned Love
 1978Hot Tuna, on the album Double Dose
 1984Hot Tuna, on the album Splashdown
 1986Hot Rize, on the album Traditional Ties
 1993Wizz Jones, on the album Late Nights and Long Days
 1995Corey Harris, on the album Between Midnight and Day
 1996Hot Rize, on the 2002 album So Long of a Journey: Live at the Bouder Theater 
 2001The Word, on the album The Word Album
 2002Andrew Bird, on the album Fingerlings
 2008The 77s, on the album Holy Ghost Building
 2008Catfish Keith, on the album Live at the Half Moon
 2011Catfish Keith, on the album A True Friend is Hard To Hard: A Gospel Retrospective
 2013Luke Winslow-King on the album The Coming Tide
 2013Marisa Anderson on the album Traditional and Public Domain Songs
 2015Larry Campbell and Teresa Williams, on the album Larry Campbell and Teresa Williams
 2016 Hugh and Katy Moffatt, on the album Now and Then
 2016Derek Trucks and Susan Tedeschi, on the album God Don't Never Change: The Songs Of Blind Willie Johnson

See also 
 "The Man Comes Around", a song based on the same biblical passages

References 

Blind Willie Johnson songs
Gospel songs
Year of song unknown
African-American spiritual songs